TKO: Total Knock Out is an American obstacle course competition series which aired on CBS. The series premiered July 11, 2018, and was hosted by comedian Kevin Hart. The show ran for 10 episodes. The series ended on September 21, 2018.

Premise
Each episode features five contestants running an obstacle course. One contestant will run through a course featuring four zones, while the remaining contestants man "battle stations," firing projectiles to try to slow the racer down or knock them off the course:

 Zone 1 ("The Ball Blaster"): Contestants must navigate narrow ledges attached to plexiglass panels they can hold, while the battle station fires soft balls from a cannon.
 Zone 2 ("The Frisboom"): Contestants must cross a narrow beam and a flexible bridge while the battle station fires large frisbee-like disks.
 Zone 3 ("The Spike Launcher"): Contestants must traverse a series of moving pedestals while the battle station fires spiked cubes.
 Zone 4 ("The Slammer"): Contestants must cross two spinning cylinders while the battle station releases giant sledge hammers.

In Zones 3 and 4, the projectiles are pre-aimed, and can only be released once each, while the first two zones allow the contestants to aim and fire as long as they have sufficient projectiles.

Contestants who are knocked off, or fall off, an obstacle once must attempt the obstacle again. A second fall constitutes a TKO; contestants can proceed to the next obstacle, but receive a one-minute penalty. Contestants who are judged to be intentionally trying to fail an obstacle may be given a five-minute penalty. In Zone 4, the second cylinder has a "time capsule" attached; grabbing the cylinder subtracts 90 seconds from the contestant's time.

For each episode, the contestant with the fastest adjusted run time—including any TKO penalties and time capsule deductions earned—wins the prize of $50,000, with contestants finishing in second, third, and fourth place receiving much smaller prizes (see table below). The five episode winners with the fastest adjusted times compete in a "Battle Royale" for $100,000.

Ratings

References

See also
 Wipeout
 American Gladiators
 American Ninja Warrior

2010s American game shows
2018 American television series debuts
2018 American television series endings
CBS original programming
English-language television shows
Television series by MGM Television
Obstacle racing television game shows
Television shows filmed in Los Angeles